Dagana is a town situated in the Saint-Louis Region of Senegal and it is the capital of the Dagana Department. Dagana shares its border with Mauritania.

The different ethnic groups in Dagana include Wolof, Fula (or Peulh), and Moor.

Populated places in Saint-Louis Region
Saint-Louis Region
Communes of Senegal